Albert II, a male rhesus macaque monkey, was the first primate and first mammal in space. He flew from Holloman Air Force Base in New Mexico, United States, to an altitude of 83 miles (134 km) aboard a U.S. V-2 sounding rocket on June 14, 1949. Albert died upon reentry after a parachute failure caused Albert's capsule to strike the ground at high speed. Albert's respiratory and cardiological data were recorded up to the moment of impact.

The capsule was redesigned in-between flights to enlarge the cramped quarters experienced by Albert I.

See also
 Monkeys and apes in space
 Animals in space
 Alice King Chatham, who designed Albert II's oxygen mask and harness
 Ham, a chimpanzee, the first great ape in space (January 31, 1961)
 Yuri Gagarin, the first human in space and first primate to orbit the Earth (April 12, 1961)
 Enos, the first chimpanzee and third primate to orbit the Earth (November 29, 1961)
 List of individual monkeys

References

Animals in space
Individual monkeys
Spaceflight before 1951
1949 in spaceflight
1949 animal deaths
Non-human primate astronauts of the American space program